István Vámos (born 18 July 1958) is a retired Hungarian gymnast. He competed at the 1980 Summer Olympics in all artistic gymnastics events and won a bronze medal with the Hungarian team. Individually his best achievement was 12th place in the vault.

References

1958 births
Living people
Gymnasts at the 1980 Summer Olympics
Olympic gymnasts of Hungary
Olympic bronze medalists for Hungary
Olympic medalists in gymnastics
Hungarian male artistic gymnasts
Medalists at the 1980 Summer Olympics
Gymnasts from Budapest
20th-century Hungarian people